Kozármisleny SE is a football club based in Kozármisleny, Hungary. The team is currently playing in the league NB III, which is the third tier of Hungarian football.

External links
Official site

Football clubs in Hungary